Rudy Winkler (born December 6, 1994) is an American male track and field athlete who competes in the hammer throw. He was the hammer national champion in 2016 and 2020, winning the 2016. and 2020 United States Olympic Trials.

Career
Born in Sand Lake, New York, Winkler attended Averill Park High School and competed in the hammer from a young age and represented the United States in age category competitions. He was a finalist at both the 2011 World Youth and the 2012 World Junior Championships in Athletics. He won his first international medal at the Pan American Junior Championships in 2013, taking the silver medal behind Mexico's Diego del Real.

He joined Cornell University and competed collegiately for their Cornell Big Red track team and was selected for the Quill and Dagger society. He topped the field of the weight throw at the 2015 Ivy League Indoor Track & Field Championships, then won the hammer title at the conference's outdoor championships later that year. At his first national event, he came eighth in the hammer at the 2015 NCAA Division I Outdoor Track and Field Championships. In the 2016 season, he defended his Ivy League Indoor title and placed tenth at the NCAA Men's Division I Indoor Track and Field Championships.

At the 2016 United States Olympic Trials a big personal best of  brought him his first national title and selection for the USA Olympic team. Although he was just short of the 77-meter qualifying standard set by the IAAF, he was invited to compete as one of the highest-ranked athletes, as an insufficient number of people had achieved the mark that year.

He currently resides in Washington, D.C. with his girlfriend, Olivia Foster.

His greatest sports influences are his friends and coaches Paddy McGrath and Roman Feldman.

International competitions

National titles
USA Outdoor Track and Field Championships
Hammer throw: 2016
Hammer throw: 2020

Personal records
Hammer throw –  (2021)
Discus throw –  (2019)
Weight throw –  (2017)

References

External links

Living people
1994 births
American male hammer throwers
Cornell Big Red men's track and field athletes
Athletes (track and field) at the 2016 Summer Olympics
Olympic track and field athletes of the United States
People from Sand Lake, New York
Track and field athletes from New York (state)
Rutgers Scarlet Knights men's track and field athletes
Athletes (track and field) at the 2019 Pan American Games
Pan American Games track and field athletes for the United States
USA Outdoor Track and Field Championships winners
Athletes (track and field) at the 2020 Summer Olympics
20th-century American people
21st-century American people